Bobyakovo is a rural locality (a selo) in Khleborodnenskoye Rural Settlement, Anninsky District, Voronezh Oblast, Russia. The population was 85 as of 2010. There are 3 streets.

Geography 
Bobyakovo is located near the Bolshoy and Maly Kurlak Rivers, 34 km west of Anna (the district's administrative centre) by road. Brodovoye is the nearest rural locality.

References 

Rural localities in Anninsky District